Cevizdalı is a village in the Şirvan District of Siirt Province in Turkey. The village had a population of 15 in 2021.

The village was part of Bitlis District of Bitlis Province until October 2022.

References 

Kurdish settlements in Siirt Province
Villages in Şirvan District